Walwan is a village located in Atpadi Taluka, Sangli district of Maharashtra, India.

Places Near
Atpadi
Vita
Bhood

Villages in Sangli district